The Agricultural Hall Tournament also called the Tournament at the Agricultural Hall was an early Victorian era men's tennis indoor wood court tennis tournament held at the Royal Agricultural Hall, Islington, Middlesex, England. It appears it was staged only once in June 1882.

History

The Agricultural Hall Tournament was an early 19th century indoor tennis event staged only one time at the Royal Agricultural Hall, Islington, Middlesex, England.

A description of the event that concluded on 20 June 1882:

This tournament feature some notable players of the day including two time Scottish Champion John Gailbraith Horn, future British Covered Court Championships winner (1886) Teddy Williams, Irish Championships and Northern Championships finalist Ernest Browne, up and coming tennis player Harry Grove, and Sussex Championships winner Donald Stewart.

Finals

Incomplete roll

Mens Challenge Cup

Oxford and Cambridge Challenge Cup

Mappin and Webb Handicap Cup

Gentlemen's Doubles

References

Sources
 Nieuwland, Alex (2011–2022). "Edition – Agricultural Hall Tournament 1882". www.tennisarchives.com. Netherlands: Tennis Archives.
 Palmers Index to the Times: (30 June 1882). Samuel Palmer. London. England. 
 Routledge's Sporting Annual (1883). George Routledge and Sons. London. England.

Defunct tennis tournaments in the United Kingdom
Tennis tournaments in England
Wood court tennis tournaments